PostNet International is the franchisor of PostNet centers, which provide graphic design and printing services for businesses and consumers. In addition, PostNet centers offer professional packing services and shipping with UPS, FedEx, DHL and the U.S. Postal Service, as well as private mailbox rental, direct mail services and more.

Since the company was founded in 1992, PostNet has grown to 660 locations in 9 countries.

History 
PostNet was founded in Las Vegas, NV in 1992 by Steve Greenbaum and Brian Spindel, and originally had Norma A. Knudsen as its COO. The company began franchising in 1993. In 2017, PostNet became part of the global family of MBE International. Combined, the two organizations have nearly 2,300 locations in 33 countries.

References

External links 

 PostNet.com
 Every Door Direct Mail (infographic)

Business services companies of the United States
Business services companies established in 1992
Companies based in Denver
1992 establishments in Colorado
Franchises